The 2020 Paris–Tours was the 114th edition of the Paris–Tours cycling classic. The race was held on 11 October 2020 as part of the 2020 UCI Europe Tour and the 2020 UCI ProSeries. Casper Pedersen, who was making his Paris–Tours debut, beat Benoît Cosnefroy, whose previous best result was third in 2018, in a two-up sprint to take the win. Pedersen's teammate Joris Nieuwenhuis, who was also making his Paris–Tours debut, won the bunch sprint from a group of five to finished third.

Teams
Four UCI WorldTeams, sixteen UCI ProTeams, and two UCI Continental teams made up the twenty-two teams that participated in the race. Of the 147 riders who entered the race, 124 finished.

UCI WorldTeams

 
 
 
 

UCI Professional Continental Teams

 
 
 
 
 
 
 
 
 
 
 
 
 
 
 
 

UCI Continental Teams

Results

References

External links
Official website

2020 UCI Europe Tour
2020 UCI ProSeries
Paris–Tours
Paris-Tours
Paris–Tours